Blossoming Lotus is a counter-service vegan restaurant in Portland, Oregon, U.S.   It was founded in Kapa'a, Hawaii, in 2002.   At its peak the company had three restaurants, but now only operates in Portland.

History
Blossoming Lotus opened in 2002, with Mark Reinfeld as chef, with financial backing from Bo Rinaldi. In 2006 Blossoming Lotus moved to a larger location at the Dragon Building in downtown Kapaa. The original location was transformed into "The Lotus Root: a juice bar and bakery".

The Blossoming Lotus Cafe in Portland, Oregon opened on July 29, 2009, in the Northeast Irvington neighborhood, and was followed by the closure of their Pearl District location. A fourth location was planned for Mountain View, California, but never came to fruition. 

Both Kauai locations closed in 2008 because of debt and a sharp downturn in tourism, a catastrophic flood that hit the island, and the closure of two budget airlines servicing the island.

The Blossoming Lotus style of international vegan cuisine was popularized in the 2004 Vegan World Fusion Cuisine Cookbook, written by founder and executive chef Mark Reinfeld and owner Bo Rinaldi. The book contains an introduction by Jane Goodall and 200 vegan recipes.

Awards and recognition

Restaurant
Food Network named them one of the top 20 vegan restaurants in the United States.
Restaurant of the Month (August 2004) - People for the Ethical Treatment of Animals
'Ilima Award for Best Kaua'i Restaurant, Critics' Choice (2006) - The Honolulu Advertiser
 Top Chef in Live Food, Platinum Carrot Chef Award (2006) - Aspen Center for Integral Health

Book
Vegan Fusion World Cuisine: Extraordinary Recipes & Timeless Wisdom from the Celebrated Blossoming Lotus Restaurants has won multiple awards:

Cookbook of the Year (2005) - VegNews Magazine
 Nautilus Book Award: Small Press (2005) - Body & Soul Magazine
 Best Vegetarian Cookbook U.S. (2005) - Gourmand World Cookbook Award 
 Best New Cookbook, Proggy award (2005) - People for the Ethical Treatment of Animals

See also
 List of vegetarian restaurants

References

External links
Blossoming Lotus Cafe Portland
Chef Mark Reinfeld's Vegan Fusion Academy

Vegan restaurants in Oregon
Restaurants in Hawaii
Restaurants established in 2002
Buildings and structures in Kauai County, Hawaii
Restaurants in Portland, Oregon
2002 establishments in Hawaii